House of Balloons is the debut mixtape by Canadian singer the Weeknd. It was released on March 21, 2011, by the artist's own record label XO. The mixtape was released for free on the Weeknd's website and was the subject of increased media discussion upon the use of its songs on television, as well as the relative anonymity of the singer-songwriter. House of Balloons was entirely recorded in Toronto, with production handled primarily by the Weeknd, Doc McKinney, Illangelo, and Cirkut; the Weeknd would later collaborate with McKinney and Illangelo on several future releases. Its title is derived from the nickname the singer gave to his former home in Parkdale, Toronto.

The mixtape received widespread acclaim, with critics praising its dark aesthetic, production, and lyrical content. It is widely regarded as a major influence on both contemporary and alternative R&B. House of Balloons also contains elements of soul, trip hop, indie rock, dream pop, and electronic music. Lyrically, the mixtape explores the Weeknd's drug use and experiences with love, heartbreak, and promiscuity.

House of Balloons was commercially released as part of the compilation album Trilogy (2012) and included the singles "Wicked Games" and "Twenty Eight", the latter of which is a bonus track. On its tenth anniversary, the original mixtape was released in digital formats, and included samples which failed to gain copyright clearance on Trilogy. The reissue was accompanied by a limited edition line of merchandise designed by architect Daniel Arsham.

Music 

The album's eclectic music uses samples of Beach House's "Master of None" (2006) and "Gila" (2008), and Aaliyah's "Rock the Boat" (2001). The title track heavily samples Siouxsie and the Banshees' 1980 single "Happy House". Pitchfork said: ""Happy House" is worked into a softly anthemic slow-burn number full of diva-ish vocals tied to a chilly beat". The guitar 'riff remains untouched and runs throughout most of the track, giving it a filmy pop feel that periodically peaks with a generous swipe from the "Happy House" chorus". The track "The Knowing" samples the 1990 track "Cherry-Coloured Funk" by Cocteau Twins. Joe Colly of Pitchfork observed "weird, morning-after tales of lust, hurt, and over-indulgence", complemented by "lush, downcast music" on the album, and compared its "specific nocturnal quality" to that of The xx's 2009 self-titled debut. Pitchforks Eric Grandy wrote that the title track has the Weeknd "emoting in an androgynous falsetto one minute, muttering unbelievable curses the next". Paul Lewster of The Guardian viewed that, although more than half of the mixtape features samples, only the title track makes it "evident".

Promotion 
The song "High for This" was featured in the promo for the final season of the HBO show Entourage in July 2011. On November 24, 2011, the Weeknd's first official music video, for his song "The Knowing," hit the Internet on his Vimeo page. The song was first released on House of Balloons and the video was directed by French filmmaker Mikael Colombu, who has also worked with American singer CeeLo Green. The nearly eight-minute clip is described by authors Carrie Battan and Amy Phillips of Pitchfork as, "a time traveling, Afrofuturist, science fiction battle of the sexes that demands to be watched in HD."

Critical reception and influence 

House of Balloons received widespread critical acclaim, and it is considered by many to be one of the most influential R&B releases in recent years, specifically the 2010s. Preceded by a string of low-profile buzz single releases throughout 2010, the mixtape attracted significant interest due to the then-anonymous identity of the individual behind the Weeknd. At Metacritic, which assigns a normalized rating out of 100 to reviews from professional publications, House of Balloons received a weighted average score of 87 based on 16 reviews, indicating "universal acclaim". Sean Fennessey of The Village Voice was impressed by the mixtape, calling it "patient, often gorgeous, and consistently louche... with the sort of blown-out underbelly and echo-laden crooning that has already made Drake's less-than-a-year-old Thank Me Later such an influential guidepost." Maegan McGregor of Exclaim! stated that House of Balloons "easily stands as one of the year's best debuts so far, hipster, top 40 or otherwise." Sputnikmusic's Tyler Fisher said that "despite being a free album, House of Balloons feels like a true album, a true labor of love." Tom Ewing of The Guardian felt that while the Weeknd's vocals and lyrics on House of Balloons "aren't especially strong by R&B standards," much of the album's attention was attracted by its strong command of mood.

In December 2011, Metacritic determined that House of Balloons was the third best-reviewed project of the year. Additionally, the mixtape was featured on several music critics' and publications' end-of-year albums lists. Complex called it the "best album of 2011;" Stereogum ranked it number 5; The Guardian ranked it number 8; The A.V. Club ranked it number 6; SPIN ranked it (as well as Thursday) number 13; while Pitchfork ranked it number 10. As a whole, House of Balloons was the seventh most frequently mentioned album in music publications' year-end top ten lists. The mixtape was named as one of the longlisted of nominees for the 2011's Polaris Music Prize. The mixtape's title track was placed on Pitchforks list of top 100 songs of 2011 at number 57, while "The Morning" was number 15. In 2021, it was listed at No. 488 on Rolling Stone's "Top 500 Best Songs of All Time".

Julian Kimble of Complex wrote, "House of Balloons, in tandem with Frank Ocean’s Nostalgia, Ultra, was responsible for a sharp pivot within R&B. The project invaded this stale area, soldering genres together to bring much-needed originality to a template mired by stagnancy at the decade’s turn. Neither his songwriting nor subject matter were cavalier, but his overall aesthetic was enticing." He later describes how, "Its channeling of temptation’s distinct gleam is a significant part of its legacy." Pitchfork wrote, "Of course, a significant part of House of Balloons’ appeal was that it was unexpected, and that it tapped into our subconscious. It satisfied an unrealized need." Bianca Gracie of Uproxx stated, "House Of Balloons is frightening in its relatability. It forced listeners to confront the loneliness they feel after realizing partying is the only thing that sustains them." Continuing to add, "Being only a year younger than Tesfaye, we had parallel coming-of-age experiences: dabbling in similar substances, using all-night college parties as escapism from depression, and ultimately sought comfort in a mixtape that targeted a shared despondency." She later stated, "The mixtape reflected a doomed generation who grew up with films like Kids, Trainspotting, Requiem For A Dream, and A Clockwork Orange. We didn’t want to be seen. Like Tesfaye, we hid our faces behind Tumblr photos that showed both a brilliant, snarky sense of humor and a not-so-subtle cry for help."

During an interview with Rolling Stone in 2015, the Weeknd said the mixtape "definitely changed the culture. No one can do a trilogy again without thanking The Weeknd [and] a lot of artists started doing things faster and quicker. Just listen to the radio: every song is House Of Balloons 2.0."

Track listing

Sample credits
"What You Need" contains a sample of "Rock the Boat" performed by Aaliyah that is not present on the Trilogy release.
"House of Balloons / Glass Table Girls" contains a sample of  "Happy House" performed by Siouxsie and the Banshees.
"The Party & The After Party" contains a sample of "Master of None" performed by Beach House.
"Coming Down" contains a voice sample from the anime Fate/stay night that is not present on the Trilogy release.
"Loft Music" contains a sample of "Gila" performed by Beach House.
"The Knowing" contains a sample of "Cherry-Coloured Funk" performed by Cocteau Twins.

Charts

Certifications

Release history

References

2011 mixtape albums
The Weeknd albums
Albums produced by Cirkut
Albums produced by Illangelo
Albums produced by the Weeknd